The M3 Lee, officially Medium Tank, M3, was an American medium tank used during World War II. The turret was produced in two forms, one for US needs and one modified to British requirements to place the radio next to the commander. In British Commonwealth service, the tank was called by two names:  tanks employing US pattern turrets were called "Lee," named after Confederate general Robert E. Lee, while those with British pattern turrets were known as "Grant," named after Union general Ulysses S. Grant.

Design commenced in July 1940, and the first M3s were operational in late 1941. The US Army needed a medium tank armed with a 75mm gun and, coupled with the United Kingdom's immediate demand for 3,650 medium tanks, the Lee began production by late 1940. The design was a compromise meant to produce a tank as soon as possible. The M3 had considerable firepower and good armor, but had serious drawbacks in its general design and shape, including a high silhouette, an archaic sponson mounting of the main gun preventing the tank from taking a hull-down position, riveted construction, and poor off-road performance.

Its overall performance was not satisfactory and the tank was withdrawn from combat in most theaters as soon as the M4 Sherman tank became available in larger numbers. In spite of this, it was considered by Hans von Luck (an Oberst (Colonel) in the Wehrmacht Heer and the author of Panzer Commander) to be superior to the best German tank at the time of its introduction, the Panzer IV (at least until the F2 variant).

Despite being replaced elsewhere, the British continued to use M3s in combat against the Japanese in southeast Asia until 1945. Nearly a thousand M3s were supplied to the Soviet military under Lend-Lease between 1941 and 1943.

Development
In , the U.S. Army possessed approximately 400 tanks, mostly M2 Light Tanks, with 18 of the to-be-discontinued M2 Medium Tanks as the only ones considered "modern." The U.S. funded tank development poorly during the interwar years, and had little experience in design as well as poor doctrine to guide design efforts.

The M2 Medium Tank was typical of armored fighting vehicles (AFVs) many nations produced in 1939. When the U.S. entered the war, the M2 design was already obsolete with a 37 mm gun, an impractical number of secondary machine guns, a very high silhouette, and  frontal armor. The Panzer III and Panzer IV's success in the French campaign led the U.S. Army to immediately order a new medium tank armed with a 75 mm gun in a turret as a response. This would be the M4 Sherman but until the Sherman reached production, an interim design with a 75 mm gun was urgently needed.

The M3 was the solution. The design was unusual because the main weapon – a larger caliber, medium-velocity 75 mm gun – was in an offset sponson mounted in the hull with limited traverse. The sponson mount was necessary because, at the time, American tank plants did not have the design experience necessary to make a gun turret capable of holding a 75 mm weapon. A small turret with a lighter, high-velocity 37 mm gun sat on top of the tall hull. A small cupola on top of the turret held a machine gun. The use of two main guns was seen on the French Char B1 and the Mark I version of the British Churchill tank. In the French tank, it had been designed as a self-propelled gun to attack fortifications and an anti-tank capability had been added through a second gun in a small turret; the Churchill carried a gun in the front hull to fire chiefly smoke shells. The M3 differed slightly from this pattern, having a dual-purpose main gun that could fire an armor-piercing projectile at a velocity high enough for effectively piercing armor, as well as deliver a high-explosive shell that was large enough to be effective. Using a hull mounted gun, the M3 design could be produced faster than a tank with the same gun in a turret. It was understood that the M3 design was flawed, but Britain urgently needed tanks. A drawback of the sponson mount was that the M3 could not take a hull-down position and use its 75 mm gun at the same time. The M3 was tall and roomy: the power transmission ran through the crew compartment under the turret basket to the gearbox driving the front sprockets. The vertical volute-sprung suspension (VVSS) units possessed a return roller mounted directly atop the main housing of each of the six suspension units (three per side), designed as self-contained and readily replaced modular units bolted to the hull sides. The turret was power-traversed by an electro-hydraulic system in the form of an electric motor providing the pressure for the hydraulic motor. This fully rotated the turret in 15 seconds. Control was from a spade grip on the gun. The same motor provided pressure for the gun stabilizing system.

The 75 mm gun was operated by a gunner and a loader; sighting the gun used an M1 periscope – with an integral telescope – on the top of the sponson. The periscope rotated with the gun. The gunner laid the gun on target through geared handwheels for traverse (15° to left and to right) and elevation ( +20° to -9°). The shorter barreled 75 mm M2 cannon sometimes featured a counterweight at the end of the barrel to balance the gun for operation with the gyrostabilizer until the longer 75 mm M3 variant was brought into use.

The 37 mm gun was aimed through the M2 periscope, mounted in the mantlet to the side of the gun. It also sighted the coaxial machine gun. Two range scales were provided: 0– for the 37 mm and 0– for the machine gun. The 37 mm gun also featured a counterweight – a long rod under the barrel – though it was ill maintained by crews who knew little about its use.

There were also two .30-06 Browning M1919A4 machine guns mounted in the hull, fixed in traverse but adjustable in elevation, which were controlled by the driver. These were, due to coordination issues, removed, though they would be seen on early Sherman tanks.

Though not at war, the U.S. was willing to produce, sell and ship munitions including armored vehicles to Britain. The British had requested that their Matilda II infantry tank and Crusader cruiser tank designs be made by American factories, but this request was refused. With much of their equipment left on the beaches near Dunkirk, the equipment needs of the British were acute. Though not entirely satisfied with the design, they ordered the M3 in large numbers. British experts had viewed the mock-up in 1940 and identified features that they considered flaws – the high profile, the hull mounted main gun, the lack of a radio in the turret (though the tank did have a radio down in the hull), the riveted armor plating (whose rivets tended to pop off inside the interior in a deadly ricochet when the tank was hit by a non-penetrating round), the smooth track design, insufficient armor plating and lack of splash-proofing of the joints.

The British desired modifications for the tank they were purchasing. A bustle rack was to be made at the back of the turret to house the Wireless Set No. 19. The turret was to be given thicker armor plate than in the original U.S. design, and the machine gun cupola was to be replaced with a simple hatch. Extended space within the turret of the new M3 also allowed the use of a smoke bomb launcher, although the addition of the radio would take the space for storage of fifty 37 mm rounds, reducing the ammunition capacity to 128 rounds. Several of these new "Grant" tanks would also be equipped with sand shields for action in North Africa, though they often fell off. With these modifications accepted the British ordered 2,000 Grants, although only 1,685 were built.

Contracts were arranged with 4 US companies for 500 tanks each: Baldwin Locomotive Co, Pullman Standard Car Co, Pressed Steel Car Co and Lima Locomotive Co.  The total cost of the orders was approximately US$240 million, including funds for factory re-tooling.  That was the total of all UK Government funds held in the US; it took the US Lend-Lease act to solve the financial shortfall and fund future equipment orders.  The order with Baldwin was later increased from 500 to 685.  Lima did not produce a single Grant against their contract as it took them so long to complete steam locomotives in production to create factory space and to tool-up that M3 production was winding down before they were ready.  It was therefore agreed that they would supply 500 of the new M4 Sherman instead.  Lima actually undertook the T6/M4 development while they were unable to manufacture the Grant and as the other companies were all too busy, and became the first company to begin producing the M4 in March 1942 with the M4A1.  The first 28 M4A1s were British contract tanks as Grant replacements but the remainder of the order was subsumed into Lend-Lease.

The prototype was completed in March 1941 and production models followed, with the first British-specification tanks produced in July. Both U.S. and British tanks had thicker armor than first planned. The British design required one fewer crew member than the US version due to the radio in the turret. The U.S. eventually eliminated the full-time radio operator, assigning the task to the driver. After extensive losses in Africa and Greece, the British realized that to meet their needs for tanks, both the Lee and the Grant types would need to be accepted.

The U.S. military used the "M" (Model) letter to designate nearly all of their equipment. When the British Army received their new M3 medium tanks from the US, confusion immediately set in between the different M3 medium tank and M3 light tank. The British Army began naming their American tanks after American military figures, although the U.S. Army never used those terms until after the war. M3 tanks with the cast turret and radio setup received the name "General Grant", while the original M3s were called "General Lee", or more usually just "Grant" and "Lee".

The chassis and running gear of the M3 design was adapted by the Canadians for their Ram tank. The hull of the M3 was also used for self-propelled artillery as with the original design of the M7 Priest, of which nearly 3,500 were built, and recovery vehicles.

Production

Operational history

Of the 6,258 M3 variants manufactured  2,887 (45%) were supplied to the British government for use by British and Commonwealth forces.  1,685 of these were Grants which the UK ordered directly from US industry for cash and which did not fall under the Lend-Lease arrangements.

The M3 Grant first saw action with the Royal Armoured Corps in North Africa during the Gazala battles of May 1942. However, with the arrival of the M4 Sherman tank from October 1942 the surviving M3s in North Africa became surplus and were mostly shipped on to India.  657 Grants and 75 Lees were supplied directly to N Africa.

97 Grants and 119 M3 Lees - including 49 diesel M3A3 Lee V, the only diesel Lees used by UK and Commonwealth forces - were supplied directly to the UK and were used for testing and training.  335 were later converted to Canal Defence Lights (no diesels), and further refurbished turretless M3 hulls were supplied by the US to support this project.

 777 were supplied directly to the Australian Army for home defence and training duties in Australia. None were used operationally. These comprised 255 Lee I, 266 Grant I and 232 Grant II.
 The British Indian Army received 896 M3 series tanks as new supply and tanks shipped from North Africa.  These comprised 517 Lee I and 379 Grant I.
 A further 1,386 were exported to the Soviet Union, although only 957 of these reached Russian ports due to German U-boat and air attacks on Allied convoys.

North African campaign
The M3 brought much-needed firepower to British forces in the North African desert campaign. Early Grants were shipped directly to Egypt and lacked some fitments (such as radio) that were remedied locally. Under the "Mechanisation Experimental Establishment (Middle East)" other modifications were tested approved and made to tanks as they were issued. These included fitting of sandshields (later deliveries from the US had factory fitted shields), dust covers for the gun mantlets and the removal of the hull machine guns. Ammunition stowage was altered to 80  75 mm (up from 50) and 80 37 mm with additional protection to the ammunition bins.

British Lees and Grants were in action against Rommel's forces at the Battle of Gazala on 27 May that year. The 8th King's Royal Irish Hussars, 3rd and 5th battalions Royal Tank Regiment going into action with Grant tanks. Retreating in the face of a large attack, the 8th Hussars had only three of their Grants remaining, while 3rd RTR reported losing 16 Grants.

Their appearance was a surprise to the Germans, who were unprepared for the M3's 75 mm gun. They soon discovered the M3 could engage them beyond the effective range of their 5 cm Pak 38 anti-tank gun, and the 5 cm KwK 39 of the Panzer III, their main medium tank. The M3 was also vastly superior to the Fiat M13/40 and M14/41 tanks employed by the Italian troops, whose 47 mm gun was effective only at point-blank range, while only the few Semoventi da 75/18 self-propelled guns were able to destroy it using HEAT rounds. In addition to the M3's superior range, they were equipped with high explosive shells to take out infantry and other soft targets, which previous British tanks lacked; upon the introduction of the M3, Rommel noted: "Up to May of 1942, our tanks had in general been superior in quality to the corresponding British types. This was now no longer true, at least not to the same extent."

Despite the M3's advantages and surprise appearance during the Battle of Gazala, it could not win the battle for the British. In particular, the high-velocity 88 mm Flak gun, adapted as an anti-tank gun, proved deadly if British tanks attacked without artillery support. Britain's Director of Armoured Fighting Vehicles nonetheless said before the M4 Sherman arrived that "The Grants and the Lees have proven to be the mainstay of the fighting forces in the Middle East; their great reliability, powerful armament and sound armor have endeared them to the troops."

Grants and Lees served with British units in North Africa until the end of the campaign. Following Operation Torch (the invasion of French North Africa), the U.S. also fought in North Africa using the M3 Lee.

The US 1st Armored Division had been issued new M4 Shermans, but had to give up one regiment's worth to the British Army prior to the Second Battle of El Alamein. Consequently, a regiment of the division was still using the M3 Lee in North Africa.

The M3 was generally appreciated during the North African campaign for its mechanical reliability, good armor protection, and heavy firepower. In all three aspects, the M3 was capable of engaging German tanks and towed anti-tank guns.

However, the high silhouette and low, hull-mounted 75 mm were tactical drawbacks since they prevented fighting from a hull-down firing position. In addition, the use of riveted hull superstructure armor on the early versions led to spalling, where the impact of enemy shells caused the rivets to break off and become projectiles inside the tank. Later models were built with all-welded armor to eliminate this problem. These lessons had already been applied to the design and production of the M4.

The M3 was replaced in front-line roles by the M4 Sherman as soon as the M4 was available. However, several specialist vehicles based on the M3 were later employed in Europe, such as the M31 armored recovery vehicle and the Canal Defence Light.

Eastern Europe—Soviet service

Beginning from 1941, 1,386 M3 medium tanks were shipped from the US to the Soviet Union, with 417 lost during shipping (when they went down with their transporting vessels which were lost to German submarine, naval and aerial attacks en route). These were supplied through the American Lend-Lease program between 1942 and 1943.

Like British Commonwealth units, Soviet Red Army personnel tended to refer to the M3 as the "Grant", even though all of the M3s shipped to Russia were "Lee" variants. The official Soviet designation for it was the М3 средний (М3с), or "M3 Medium", to distinguish the Lee from the US-built M3 Stuart light tank, which was also acquired by the USSR under Lend-Lease and was officially known there as the М3 лёгкий (М3л), or "M3 Light". Due to the vehicle's petrol-fuelled engine, a high tendency to catch fire, and its vulnerability against most types of German armour the Soviet troops encountered from 1942 onwards, the tank was almost entirely unpopular with the Red Army since its induction into the Eastern Front.

With almost 1,500 of their own T-34 tanks being built every month, Soviet use of the M3 medium tank declined soon after mid-1943. Soviet troops still fielded their Lee/Grant tanks on secondary and quieter/less-action fronts, such as in the Arctic region during the Red Army's Petsamo–Kirkenes Offensive against German forces in Norway in October 1944, where the obsolete US tanks faced mainly captured French tanks used by the Germans, such as the SOMUA S35, which to a limited extent was somewhat comparable to the Lee/Grant it fought against.

Pacific War
In the Pacific War, armored warfare played a relatively minor role for the Allies as well as for the Japanese, compared with that of naval, air, and infantry units.

In the Pacific Ocean Theater and the Southwest Pacific Theater, the U.S. Army deployed none of its dedicated armored divisions and only a third of its 70 other separate tank battalions.

A small number of M3 Lees saw action in the central Pacific Ocean Theater in 1943.

While the US Marine Corps deployed all six of its tank battalions, none of these were equipped with the M3 Lee. (USMC tank battalions were equipped initially with M3 Stuarts, which were then replaced by M4 Shermans in mid-1944.)

Some M3 Grants played an offensive role with the British Indian Army, in the Southeast Asian Theater.

The Australian Army also used Grants during World War II, mainly for homeland defence and training purposes.

Pacific Ocean Theater 

The only combat use of the M3 Lee by the US Army against Japanese forces occurred during the Gilbert and Marshall Islands campaign of 1943.

Following the better-known landing at Tarawa, the US 27th Infantry Division made an amphibious assault on Makin Island with armoured support from a platoon of M3A5 Lees equipped with deep-wading kits belonging to the US Army's 193rd Tank Battalion.

Burma 

After British Commonwealth forces in Europe and the Mediterranean began receiving M4 Shermans, about 900 British-ordered M3 Lees/Grants were shipped to the Indian Army. Some of these saw action against Japanese troops and tanks in the Burma Campaign of WWII.

They were used by the British Fourteenth Army until the fall of Rangoon, regarded as performing "admirably" in the original intended role of supporting infantry in Burma between 1944 and 1945.

In the Burma Campaign, the M3 medium tank's main task was infantry support. It played a pivotal role during the Battle of Imphal, during which the Imperial Japanese Army's 14th Tank Regiment (primarily equipped with their own Type 95 Ha-Go light tanks, together with a handful of captured British M3 Stuart light tanks as well) encountered M3 medium tanks for the first time and found their light tanks outgunned and outmatched by the better British armour. Despite their worse-than-average off-road performance, the British M3 tanks performed well as they traversed the steep hillsides around Imphal and defeated the assaulting Japanese forces. Officially declared obsolete in April 1944, nevertheless, the Lee/Grant saw action until the end of the war in September 1945.

Australia 
At the beginning of the war, Australian Army doctrine viewed tank units as minor offensive components within infantry divisions. It had no dedicated armoured branch and most of its very limited capabilities in tank warfare had been deployed to the North African Campaign (i.e. three divisional cavalry battalions). By early 1941, the effectiveness of large-scale German panzer attacks had been recognised, and a dedicated armoured mustering was formed. The Australian Armoured Corps initially included the cadres of three armoured divisions – all of which were equipped at least partly with M3 Grants made available from surplus British orders.

The 1st Australian Armoured Division was formed with a view towards complementing the three Australian infantry divisions then in North Africa. However, following the outbreak of hostilities with Japan, the division was retained in Australia. During April–May 1942, the 1st Armoured Division's regiments were reported to be re-equipping with M3 Grants and were training, in a series of large exercises, in the area around Narrabri.

The cadres of other two divisions, the 2nd and 3rd Armoured Divisions were both officially formed in 1942, as Militia (reserve/home defence) units. These divisions were also partly equipped with M3 Grants.

In January 1943, the main body of the 1st Armoured Division was deployed to home defence duties between Perth and Geraldton, where it formed part of III Corps.

By the middle of the war, the Australian Army had deemed the Grant to be unsuitable for combat duties overseas and M3 units were re-equipped with the Matilda II before being deployed to the New Guinea and Borneo Campaigns. Due to personnel shortages, all three divisions were officially disbanded during 1943 and downgraded to brigade- and battalion-level units.

Post-war use in Australia
During the war, the Australian Army had converted some M3 Grants for special purposes, including a small number of bulldozer variants, beach armoured recovery vehicles, and wader prototypes.

Following the end of the war, 14 of the Australian M3A5 Grants were converted to a local self-propelled gun design, the Yeramba, becoming the only SPG ever deployed by the Australian Army. Fitted with a 25-pounder field gun, the Yerambas remained in service with the 22nd Field Regiment, Royal Australian Artillery, until the late 1950s.

Many M3s deemed surplus to Australian Army requirements were acquired by civilian buyers during the 1950s and 1960s for conversion to earthmoving equipment and/or tractors.

Conclusion

Overall, the M3 was able to be effective on the battlefield from 1942 until 1943. However, US armored units lacked tactical expertise on a method to overcome its design. Its armor and firepower were equal or superior to most of the threats it faced, especially in the Pacific. Long-range, high-velocity guns were not yet common on German tanks in the African theater. However, the rapid pace of tank development meant that the M3 was very quickly outclassed. By mid-1942, with the introduction of the German Tiger I, the up-gunning of the Panzer IV to a long 75 mm gun, and the first appearance in 1943 of the Panther, along with the availability of large numbers of the M4 Sherman, the M3 was withdrawn from service in the European Theater.

Variants

US variants
American designations first with British Commonwealth designations (where actually used) given in parentheses

M3 (Lee I)
Original baseline design. Riveted hull. Continental radial gasoline engine. 4,724 built.
M3A1
Cast (rounded) upper hull variant. 300 built. 28 were experimentally converted with the Guiberson T-1400-2 350 hp radial diesel engine, which proved unsatisfactory.  Never used operationally.
M3A2
Welded hull version of baseline M3. Only 12 produced, 10 of which were completed as Grant I. At least 1 of these was supplied to Australia and another was converted to a Grant Scorpion.
M3A3 (Lee V)
Diesel-engined variant with welded hull. Twin GM 6-71 diesel engines coupled together to make the GM6046 powerpack. Side doors welded shut or later eliminated. 288 built, 49 supplied to the UK and 77 supplied to Brazil.  83 M3A3 hulls completed as Grant II.
M3A4
Stretched riveted hull to accommodate the Chrysler A57 multibank engine, made up of five 4.12 litre displacement, 6-cyl L-head car engines (block upwards) mated to a common crankshaft. Displacement 21 litres,  at 2,700 rpm. Side doors eliminated. 109 built.  Only used for training in the USA.
M3A5
Rivetted hull but otherwise as per the M3A3. 591 built, 387 as Grant IIs.  Only used operationally once by US forces.  23 supplied to Brazil.
M31 Tank Recovery Vehicle (Grant ARV I)
Based on M3 chassis, with dummy turret and guns. A  winch installed.
M31B1 Tank Recovery Vehicle
Based on M3A3.
M31B2 Tank Recovery Vehicle
Based on M3A5.
There were 296 total M31B1/B2 vehicles, although the precise quantity of both variants is unknown (it appears that M31B1 was more common). 146 of them were converted from used tanks and 150 from newly built tanks before their acceptance.
M33 Prime Mover
M31 TRV converted to the artillery tractor role, with turret and crane removed. 109 vehicles were converted in 1943-44.
105 mm Howitzer Motor Carriage M7 (Priest)
105 mm M1/M2 howitzer installed in open superstructure. A gunless version was used as an observation post (OP) vehicle
155 mm Gun Motor Carriage M12
Designed as the T6. A 155 mm howitzer on M3 chassis. 100 built in 1942-1943. M30 Cargo Carrier on same chassis to transport gun crew and ammunition.

British Commonwealth service names and variants

Grant I 
 M3 and M3A2 with turret to British specification and internal differences, no cupola. 1,211 M3-based and 10 M3A2-based Grant Is supplied.
Grant II
Final Baldwin production based on M3A3 and M3A5 after US Ordnance ordered them to switch from petrol to diesel production. 381 Grant IIs based on M3A5s were supplied along with 83 based on M3A3s.
Grant ARV
A single prototype conversion of a Grant I.  Turret and hull gun removed and replaced with armored recovery vehicle equipment including winch and jib. A twin Bren light machine gun mount was fitted for AA defence.  The superior M31 was adopted instead in small numbers.
Grant ARV I
US T2 (later M31).  It is not clear which version(s) the UK received: M31, M31B1 or M32B2.
Grant Command
Fitted with map table and extra radio equipment. On some, the 37mm guns were removed or replaced with dummies.
Grant Scorpion III
 gun removed to allow for fitment with Scorpion III mine flail by REME workshops, few made in January 1943 for use in Tunisia campaign in North Africa. At least 1 was based on a welded-hull Grant.
Grant Scorpion IV
Scorpion III with additional Bedford motor at rear to increase Scorpion flail power.
Grant CDL
"Canal Defence Light"; 37mm turret replaced by one with a powerful carbon arc light which could be set to flicker rapidly to disorient the enemy.  A BESA (UK) or Browning M1919 (US) machine gun was fitted and some were fitted with a dummy 37mm gun. The Grant CDL replaced the earlier Matilda II CDL in anticipation of use in North West Europe. 335 were converted in the UK, some on refurbished M3 Lee hulls specially supplied by the US.  The US also produced 497 of their own version to equip 6 tank battalions under the designation Shop Tractor T10 to disguise its purpose.  Some of these used the M3A1 cast hull.

Australian variants

M3 BARV
 A single M3A5 was converted into a "Beach Armoured Recovery Vehicle".
Yeramba Self Propelled Gun.
Australian Self-propelled 25-pounder. 13 vehicles built in 1949 on M3A5 chassis in a conversion very similar to the Canadian Sexton.

Designs based on chassis
Medium Tank M4 Sherman
Tank Cruiser, Ram - see article for full list of variants
105 mm Self Propelled Gun, Priest
Kangaroo armoured personnel carrier
25pdr SP, tracked, Sexton Mark I - Sexton Mark II was on a Grizzly (M4-based) chassis
M12 Gun Motor Carriage -   155mm field gun

Operators

  Australia did not use the M3 series operationally and all remained in Australia. 777 were supplied directly from the USA: 290 Grant I, 232 Grant II and 255 Lee I. 149 Grant IIs were kept in post-war reserve service until 1955, by which date only 50 were still operational.
  77 M3A3 and 23 M3A5 supplied
   Canada used the M3 platform to develop its own Ram tank but did not use the M3 tank itself.
  Free French forces operated the M31 ARV series but did not operate the M3 as a gun tank.
 : One captured during operations in 1942; later recaptured by the Red Army.
  896 M3s were received, a mix of new delivery and shipments from N Africa: 517 Lee I and 379 Grant I.
 : Four captured in Crimea during operations in early 1944
  1,386 M3 supplied.
  1,685 Grant and 1,202 Lee supplied. These figures include tanks shipped directly to India and Australia. 657 Grant and 75 Lee were supplied directly to N Africa with 97 Grant and 119 Lee supplied directly to the UK.

In popular culture 
 In the 1943 movie Sahara, starring Humphrey Bogart, the character's main form of transportation was an M3 Lee named "Lulu Belle"; the same is true of the 1995 remake starring Jim Belushi.
 An M3 Lee tank (also named "Lulu Belle") was featured in the 1979 Steven Spielberg comedy film 1941.
 In the anime Girls und Panzer, the M3 Lee is used by the Rabbit Team, of Ōarai Academy.

See also

 SCR-245
 List of "M" series military vehicles
List of U.S. military vehicles by supply catalog designation

Notes

Explanatory footnotes

Citations

General references 

 Bishop, Chris The Encyclopedia of Weapons of World War II (2002) Metro Books. 
 
 
 Hunnicutt, R. P. Sherman, A History of the American Medium Tank. 1978; Taurus Enterprises. .
 Porter, David Allied Tanks of World War II (World's Great Weapons) (2014) Amber Books Ltd. 
 USMC D-F Series Tables of Equipment (TOEs), 1942-1944
.
 .
 
 Zaloga, Steven. Armored Thunderbolt: The US Army Sherman in World War II. 2008; Stackpole Books. .

Further reading

External links

 British M3, M3A2, M3A3 and M3A5 Grants 
 "U.S. Army's 29 ton tanks packs a 75mm gun" Popular Mechanics, July 1941—one of the first public articles about the M-3
 Tanks Are Mighty Fine Things, 1946 : 145-page book about wartime production of tanks by Chrysler Corporation, including the M3.
 AFV Database
 World War II Vehicles
 M3, M3A1, M3A3, M3A4 at OnWar
 M3 in the USSR

Medium tanks of the United States
Military vehicles introduced from 1940 to 1944
World War II medium tanks
Lee Grant, M3